Boost Mobile may refer to:

 Boost Mobile (Australia), an Australian mobile virtual network operator
 Boost Mobile (United States), an American mobile virtual network operator owned by Dish Wireless
 Spark New Zealand, a telecommunications company in New Zealand which used the Boost Mobile brand prior to 2007